Enactment may refer to:

Law 
 Enactment of a bill, when a bill becomes law
 Enacting formula, formulaic words in a bill or act which introduce its provisions
 Enactment (British legal term), a piece of legislation or a legal instrument made under a piece of legislation

Other 
Enactment (psychology), in relational psychoanalysis, a playing out of a mental scenario
Enactment effect, in linguistics, in which verb phrases are better memorized if a learner performs the described action while learning the phrase

See also
Other steps after enactment of a bill
Promulgation, the formal proclamation that a new law is enacted after its final approval
Coming into force, the process by which legal instruments come to have legal force and effect
Reenactment (disambiguation)